Fugly (or "F*UGLY", as it appears on the poster) is a 2014 Indian Hindi comedy-drama social thriller film directed by Kabir Sadanand and produced by Ashvini Yardi and Alka Bhatia. It was released on 13 June 2014. The film features Jimmy Sheirgill as one of many lead characters, including debut appearances from Mohit Marwah, Vijender Singh, Arfi Lamba and Kiara Advani.

Plot 
Dev (Mohit Marwah), Devi (Kiara Advani), Gaurav (Vijender Singh) and Aditya (Arfi Lamba) are close friends. Gaurav is the son of the CM of Haryana, while the rest of his friends are commoners. Gaurav is uninterested in his family's politics and is the only educated person in his family. Gaurav is nice-hearted, but always high on adrenaline because of his influential father. He has a knack of getting into trouble with police because of this attitude, but the police tend to ignore his pranks.
A local grocer, Nunu has an evil eye on Devi and one day gropes her in his shop. The four of them decide to teach him a lesson. At night, they decide to break into his shop and thrash him warning him not to see her again. Although outnumbered and in bad state Nunu challenges them to leave Devi behind for him. Dev is very angry and decides to teach him a lesson. They put him in their car's trunk and drive him to an isolated location. They are intercepted by Inspector R.S. Chautala (Jimmy Shergill) who is patrolling the highway. Gaurav, as usual, tries to act smart and gets involved in a scuffle with Chautala. This enrages him and he suspects foul play. When he checks the car he discovers Nunu inside the trunk. Chautala kills Nunu in order to frame them in his murder case. In the morning after severe threat he puts up a demand of Rs. 6.1 million of ransom money, which they have to arrange in 24 hours. Gaurav is afraid to tell his father about the incident because he was actually involved in Nunu's kidnapping, since this would cost his father his CM chair. Somehow everyone is able to arrange 2.4 million.

Chautala further blackmails them by recording them handing over the money to him, as evidence of attempting to bribe a policeman. He gives them 3 more days to arrange for the money with additional Rs. 1 million as penalty. The four of them are further forced to arrange a rave party with a drug dealer, which is again raided by Chautala. He forces them into drug dealing as well to extract more juice out of them.

The four of them decide that they had enough and want to expose him in a sting operation. They almost succeed in extracting a confession out of him on camera, but are busted and Chautala also kidnaps Devi. Chautala outsmarts them on every step and the four slip deep into trouble with every step they try. Finally, they are arrested on false charges and meanwhile out on bail.

Dev in the end decides that he has to sacrifice his life to expose the truth. In the next scene, Dev is in the hospital and his narration is interrupted by Chautala. He clears up the ICU room of everyone to have a private moment with Dev. Dev tricks him by cutting off his own life support and getting into a scuffle with Chautala. As the medics and reporters rush into the room, they find Dev dead and it appears as if Chautala has killed him. This is telecast live on the news. Chautala attempts to blackmail Gaurav's father in an isolated region but is shot dead by his colleague.

Cast

 Mohit Marwah as Dev
 Kiara Advani as Devi
 Jimmy Shergill as Inspector R.S. Chautala
 Vijender Singh as Gaurav
 Arfi Lamba as Aditya
 Anshuman Jha as Cheeni (Special appearance)
 Mansha Bahl as Dr. Payal
 Sana Saeed as a dancer (Special appearance in song Lovely Jind Wali)
 Akshay Kumar as himself (Special appearance in Fugly Title Song)
Salman Khan as himself (Special appearance in Fugly Title Song)

Production
Plans for Fugly were announced in 2013, and actors such as Salman Khan and Akshay Kumar were confirmed to be performing in the film. Filming for Fugly was initially intended to begin in September 2013, but was delayed until October of the same year. Filming took place in Delhi and Mumbai, and the key song was shot in March 2014.

Release

Critical reception
Critic Subhash K. Jha gave it 4 stars and said that this film is thoughtful and at times brilliant. Moreover, it possesses a very rare virtue, a conscience.

Box office
Fugly had a  budget and grossed  worldwide.

Soundtrack

Soundtrack
The soundtrack is composed by Prashant Vadhyar, Yo Yo Honey Singh & Raftaar. All lyrics written by Yo Yo Honey Singh, Raftaar Dillin Nair, Arshia Nahid, Sumit Aroraa, Niren Bhatt & Rajveer Ahuja.

References

External links
 
 

2010s buddy films
2010s Hindi-language films
2014 thriller drama films
Indian thriller drama films
Indian buddy comedy films
Films scored by Yo Yo Honey Singh
Films scored by Raftaar
2014 films
2014 comedy-drama films
2014 masala films